This list of the oldest companies in the United States includes brands and companies, excluding associations, educational, government or religious organizations. To be listed, a brand or company name must remain, either whole or in part, since inception. To limit the scope of this list, only companies established before 1820 are listed. If the original name has since changed due to acquisitions or renaming, this must be verifiable. Entries in grey indicate that the companies have endured some significant change in their status or condition.

See also
 List of oldest companies
 List of oldest companies in Australia

References

Oldest
Oldest companies
Oldest companies, United States
Oldest companies in the United States
Oldest things